Mulu Nega Kahsay (born 15 November 1967) is an Ethiopian academic and politician serving as the federal Ethiopian Minister of Science and Education and was the former chief executive of the Transitional Government of Tigray from until May 2021 In November 2020 during the Tigray conflict, the House of Federation appointed Mulu Nega to replace Debretsion Gebremichael as chief executive of the Tigray Region;

Childhood and education
He obtained his PhD from the University of Twente in 2012, with a thesis titled, "Quality and quality assurance in Ethiopian higher education: critical issues and practical implications".

Research and teaching
Mulu served as an assistant professor at Addis Ababa University.

Politics
Mulu became Minister of Science and Higher Education in Ethiopia on 6 May 2020.

During the Tigray conflict in November 2020, Mulu Nega was appointed as chief executive of the Transitional Government of Tigray by the House of Federation to replace Debretsion Gebremichael of the Tigray People's Liberation Front as President of the Tigray Region. He appeared publicly on 11 February, after holding talks with Ahunna Eziakonwa of the United Nations Development Program on cooperation in reconstructing Tigray Region, in his role as head of the transitional government.

Personal life
Mulu is married and has three children.

Bibliography
 Current Issues in Ethiopian Private Higher Educational Institutions: Opportunities and Challenges

References

Ethiopian political people
Tigray Region
Living people
1967 births